Chaplain (Major General) Stuart E. Barstad, USAF (August 9, 1929 – August 25, 2009) was an American Air Force officer who served as Chief of Chaplains of the United States Air Force from 1985 to 1988.

Biography
Barstad was born in Colfax, Wisconsin, in 1929. He graduated from Colfax High School and obtained a B.A. from St. Olaf College. Barstad graduated from Luther Seminary and was ordained in 1955. Later he received honorary doctorates from Susquehanna University and Norwich University. Barstad was married to Ruth and had two children. He died on August 25, 2009, and is buried at Arlington National Cemetery.

Military career
Barstad joined the Air Force in 1955. His assignments included being stationed at Dover Air Force Base, Vandenberg Air Force Base, Ramstein Air Base, Randolph Air Force Base, The Pentagon, and Peterson Air Force Base. In 1982 he was named Deputy Chief of Chaplains of the Air Force in 1982 before being named Chief of Chaplains in 1985. His retirement was effective as of November 1, 1988.

Awards he received include the Legion of Merit, the Meritorious Service Medal with three oak leaf clusters, and the Air Force Commendation Medal.

See also
Chief of Chaplains of the United States Air Force

References

People from Colfax, Wisconsin
Military personnel from Wisconsin
Religious leaders from Wisconsin
United States Air Force generals
Recipients of the Legion of Merit
Chiefs of Chaplains of the United States Air Force
20th-century American Lutheran clergy
St. Olaf College alumni
Burials at Arlington National Cemetery
1929 births
2009 deaths
Vietnam War chaplains
Norwich University alumni
Luther Seminary alumni